Nobody's Perfect is a 1968 American comedy film about the fictional USS Bustard and the antics of her crew. It is based on the novel The Crows of Edwina Hill, written by author of western novels and former Navy man Allan R. Bosworth.

Plot
After World War II, four somewhat drunk US Navy sailors steal a Buddha statue from a Japanese village, but as they row back to their ship, they hear that the Navy is cracking down against such thefts, so they hide the statue in a cave. Three of the men are transferred, but the fourth, "Doc" Willoughby, sticks around aboard the submarine rescue vessel USS Bustard, based in Japan, much to the seeming exasperation of his captain, Mike Riley. (In reality, Riley thinks well of Willoughby, despite his occasional antics, and keeps persuading him to continue reenlisting.) Over the next 12 years, Willoughby gets promoted and demoted repeatedly, but eventually rises to the rank of chief petty officer.

While on liberty ashore, Willoughby falls for a seemingly demure Japanese girl in a kimono shop, who turns out to be a US Navy Nurse Corps officer of Japanese-American descent, Lieutenant Tomiko Momoyama (Kwan). She discovers she was betrothed as a child to a Japanese man named Toshi (Shigeta), who (after seeing her) fully intends to follow tradition. Toshi's uncle turns out to be from the village from which the statue was taken. Willoughby divides his time between trying to return the statue to the village and wooing Tomiko.

Cast
Doug McClure - HMC "Doc" Willoughby, USN 
Nancy Kwan - LT Tomiko Momoyama, NC, USN 
James Whitmore - LCDR Mike Riley, USN, Commanding Officer of USS Bustard 
James Shigeta - Toshi O'Hara 
 Steve Carlson - Johnny Crane 
Jill Donohue - Marci Adler  
David Hartman - Boats McCafferty 
Gary Vinson - Walt Purdy 
George Furth - Hamner 
Keye Luke - Gondai-San
Edward Faulkner as John Abelard

References

External links 
 
 
 

1968 films
Films based on American novels
Comedy films about Asian Americans
1968 comedy films
Films set in Japan
Japan in non-Japanese culture
1960s English-language films
1960s American films